Kootanae House, also spelled Kootenae House, was a North West Company fur trading post built by Jaco Finlay under the direction of David Thompson near present-day Invermere, British Columbia in 1807. It was abandoned in 1812.

The site was designated a National Historic Site of Canada in 1934.

In July 2005, Parks Canada, in cooperation with several members of the Ktunaxa Nation conducted archaeological investigations at the site of Thompson's Kootanae House, near Invermere BC. Kootanae House was David Thompson's first post constructed in the Columbia Basin and his "jumping off point" for further explorations throughout the region. The Archaeology confirms that this site is the location of a North West Company trading posts and lays to rest some inconsistencies between the site and Thompson's description of the trading post.

See also
List of National Historic Sites of Canada in British Columbia
Kullyspell House
Saleesh House
Fort Kootenay
Kootenay, British Columbia (Fisherville)

References

Fur trade National Historic Sites of Canada
History of British Columbia
History of the Pacific Northwest
Oregon Country
Heritage sites in British Columbia
Columbia Valley
North West Company
National Historic Sites in British Columbia
Forts or trading posts on the National Historic Sites of Canada register